The 2008 Losail Superbike World Championship round was the opening round of the 2008 Superbike World Championship season. It took place on the weekend of February 21–23, 2008 at the 5.38 km Losail International Circuit in Qatar.

Superbike race 1 classification

Superbike race 2 classification

Supersport race classification

Losail
Supebike World Championship